The sacking of Osceola was a Kansas Jayhawker initiative on September 23, 1861, to push out pro-slavery Southerners at Osceola, Missouri.  It was not authorized by Union military authorities but was the work of an informal group of anti-slavery Kansas "Jayhawkers". The town of 2,077 people  was plundered and burned to the ground, 200 slaves were freed and nine local citizens were court-martialed and executed.

Background
Following Sterling Price's secessionist Missouri State Guard victory over General Nathaniel Lyon's Union army at the Battle of Wilson's Creek, Price continued his goal of keeping control of Missouri from the Unionists.

Guerilla leader James H. Laneoften called the leader of the Jayhawkersorganized 1,200 troops to resist Price's invasion into Kansas. Price defeated Lane at the Battle of Dry Wood Creek near Fort Scott, Kansas. Lane retreated and Price continued his offensive further into Missouri to the Siege of Lexington.

While Price moved North, Lane launched an attack behind him.  After crossing the Missouri border at Trading Post, Kansas on September 10, Lane began an offensive moving East on Butler, Harrisonville, Osceola and Clinton, Missouri.

Osceola
The climax of the campaign was on September 23, 1861, at Osceola, where Lane's forces drove off a small Southern force and then looted and burned the town. An artillery battery under Capt. Thomas Moonlight shelled the St. Clair County courthouse. According to reports, many of the Kansans got so drunk that when it came time to leave they were unable to march and had to ride in wagons and carriages. They carried off with them a tremendous load of plunder, including as Lane's personal share a piano and a quantity of silk dresses. Lane led hundreds of slaves to Kansas and freedom. The troops moved northwest and arrived at Kansas City, Missouri, on September 29, to pursue Price as he retreated south through the state.

Osceola was captured and then plundered, with Lane's men freeing 200 slaves and taking 350 horses, 400 cattle, 3,000 bags of flour, and quantities of supplies from all the town shops and stores as well as carriages and wagons. Nine local men were rounded up, given a quick drumhead court-martial trial, and executed. All but three of the town's 800 buildings burned; the town never fully recovered.

Aftermath
Lane's raid stirred hatred that led to William Quantrill's raid on Lawrence, Kansas, leading in turn to the depopulation of four counties of western Missouri under General Order No. 11.

References

Civilians killed in the American Civil War
1861 in Missouri
1861 in the American Civil War
Massacres of the American Civil War
Union war crimes
Military operations of the American Civil War in Kansas
Military operations of the American Civil War in Missouri
September 1861 events
St. Clair County, Missouri
Looting
People executed by the United States military by firing squad